Bori Dam, is an earthfill dam on Bori river near Naldurg, Dharashiv (Osmanabad) district in state of Maharashtra in India.

Specifications

Purpose
 Irrigation

See also
 Dams in Maharashtra
 List of reservoirs and dams in India

References

Dams completed in 1977
1977 establishments in Maharashtra